William Watson Henderson, 1st Baron Henderson PC (8 August 1891 – 4 April 1984), was a British Labour politician.

Background
Henderson was the second son of Arthur Henderson and the elder brother of Arthur Henderson, Baron Rowley.

Political career
He sat as Member of Parliament for Enfield from 1923 to 1924 and from 1929 to 1931 and served as Parliamentary Private Secretary to the Secretary of State for India William Wedgwood Benn from 1929 to 1931. He was also Head of the Press and Publicity Department of the Labour Party and served during the Second World War as Personal Assistant to the Minister without Portfolio Arthur Greenwood from 1940 to 1942. In 1945 he was raised to the peerage as Baron Henderson, of Westgate in the City and County of Newcastle upon Tyne. Henderson served in the Labour administration of Clement Attlee as a Lord-in-waiting (government whip in the House of Lords) and an additional member of the Air Council from 1945 to 1947 and as Joint Under-Secretary of State for Foreign Affairs from 1948 to 1951. In the 1950 Birthday Honours he was admitted to the Privy Council.

Personal life
 
Lord Henderson died in April 1984, aged 92. He never married and the title became extinct on his death. He was cremated at Golders Green Crematorium.

Notes

References

External links 
 
 

1891 births
1984 deaths
Labour Party (UK) MPs for English constituencies
UK MPs 1923–1924
UK MPs 1929–1931
UK MPs who were granted peerages
Labour Party (UK) hereditary peers
Place of birth missing
Members of the Privy Council of the United Kingdom
Ministers in the Attlee governments, 1945–1951
Barons created by George VI